In ice hockey, point has three contemporary meanings.

Personal statistic
A point is awarded to a player for each goal scored or assist earned. The total number of goals plus assists equals total points. The Art Ross Trophy is awarded to the National Hockey League (NHL) player who leads the league in scoring points at the end of the regular season.

Team statistic
Points are also awarded to assess standings (or rankings). Historically, NHL teams were awarded two points for each win, one point for each tie, and no points for a loss. Such a ranking system, implemented primarily to ensure a tie counted as a "half-win" for each team in the standings, is generally regarded as British and/or European in origin, and as such was adopted by the NHL which was founded in Canada where leagues generally used ranking systems of British origin. Awarding points in the standings contrasts with traditional American ranking systems favored in sports originating within the United States where today the majority of NHL teams are based. Leagues in sports of U.S. origin, which traditionally placed a greater emphasis on rules intended to make ties uncommon or impossible, generally rank teams by wins and/or winning percentages.

However, there are no longer ties in the NHL as a result of many rule changes, after the 2004–05 NHL lockout. A rule that was instituted in the 1999–2000 NHL season states that when a team loses in overtime, they shall earn one point for making it to overtime. The rule includes shootouts, which were instituted after the aforementioned lockout.

Points awarded to teams losing in overtime and shootouts are sometimes pejoratively labelled loser points - or, often also intended in a pejorative sense, Bettman points after the NHL commissioner who introduced them to the league. Supporters of the current point structure argue that the point for an overtime or shootout loss is not a point for losing but, rather, a point earned for the initial draw with teams that winning in overtime or a shootout receiving an additional "bonus" point.

In contrast, many European leagues (although, notably, not the Kontinental Hockey League) as well as international tournaments sanctioned by the International Ice Hockey Federation now use a system that awards three points for a regulation win, two for an overtime or shootout win, one for an overtime or shootout loss and none for a regulation loss. In essence, this system replicates the ranking system now used in soccer (three points for a regulation win and one for a regulation tie) in addition to the overtime/shootout "bonus point" used in the NHL. Supporters of this format contend it gives teams a greater incentive to win in regulation time and reduces the relative value of the "loser point" and also ensures the same number of points (i.e. three) are awarded for each game. However, as of 2021 the NHL and KHL have resisted calls to adopt this format.

Position
When a team is in the offensive zone, the area near the blue line and the boards is referred to as "the point". When a team is on the power play, its defencemen usually take up positions at the point. The name is taken from the former names of the defence positions, point and cover point, as first developed in the 19th century, the earliest days of ice hockey's development.

See also
Rover (ice hockey)

References

External links
 NHL Rulebook, Rule #78 – Goals and Assists

Ice hockey statistics
Ice hockey terminology